The Blaine Formation is a geologic formation in Oklahoma. It preserves fossils dating back to the Permian period.

See also

 List of fossiliferous stratigraphic units in Oklahoma
 Paleontology in Oklahoma

References
 

Permian geology of Oklahoma
Permian geology of Texas